Hans-Jörg Rheinberger (born 12 January 1946) is an historian of science who comes from Liechtenstein. He was director of the Max Planck Institute for the History of Science in Berlin from 1997 to 2014. His focus areas within the history of science are the history and epistemology of the experiment, and further the history of molecular biology and protein biosynthesis. Additionally he writes and publicizes essays and poems.

Life 
Hans-Jörg Rheinberger was born in Grabs, Switzerland on 12 January 1946. He is the great-grandnephew of the composer Josef Rheinberger and grandchild of the artist and architect . He studied philosophy, linguistics and biology at the University of Tübingen, the Free University of Berlin and the Technical University of Berlin. After completing his magister degree in philosophy (1973) he earned his doctorate (Dr. rer. nat.) in 1982 with a dissertation concerned with protein biosynthesis and habilitated 1987 in molecular biology at the FU Berlin. From 1982 until 1990 Rheinberger worked as research assistant and research group superintendent at the Max Planck Institute for Molecular Genetics in Berlin-Dahlem. The following two years he spend as visiting professor at the universities of Salzburg and Innsbruck. After a sabbatical at Stanford University (1989/90 within the program "History of Science"), he was senior lecturer at the Institute for the History of Medicine and Science of the University of Lübeck from 1990 until 1994. Subsequently, Rheinberger was associate professor at the University of Salzburg until 1996.

Since 1996 Rheinberger is scientific member of the Max Planck Society and has been director at the Max Planck Institute for the History of Science from 1997 until 2014. Since then he is Emeritus scientific member of the institute. From 1993 until 1994 he has been fellow at the Berlin Institute for Advanced Study. In 2000 Rheinberger taught in the capacity of visiting scholar at the Collegium Helveticum of the Swiss Federal Institute of Technology in Zurich, 2006 at the Johns Hopkins University in Baltimore and 2016 at the Northwestern University in Evaston. He is honorary professor at the TU Berlin, member of the Berlin-Brandenburg Academy of Sciences and Humanities, the Academy of Sciences Leopoldina, as well as the P.E.N.-Club Liechtenstein.

Research 
Rheinberger's primary field of activity within the history of science is the epistemological exploration of the experiment and of the research practices of the natural sciences with focus on the biology of the 19th and 20th century. In his studies he describes "experimental systems" to be the driving forces within the development of the modern natural sciences. He developed his corpus of theoretical categories in dependence to the philosophy of Jacques Derrida and draws many inspirations form the works of Gaston Bachelard.

His main focus is aimed at the "structures of the experiment", which he deciphers by applying reconstructive analysis to the work in laboratories concerned with biological research. In contrast to the common self-image the researching science themselves hold Rheinberger shows that planning and control is less defining the every-day-business of research than improvisation and chance. According to Rheinberger promising "experimental systems" are distinguished by the amount of space the grant an "epistemic thing" to unfold itself. This is, as he puts it, imperative to "deal prodictively the unknown".

The "epistemic thing" 
The "epistemic thing" is the object of investigation during the research process, which can develop to become a "technical object" over the course of the investigation, therefore becoming something that can be used to research other "epistemic things". The boundary between "epistemic thing" and "technical object" is not static and identifying something as either or not permanent. Therefore, insight is neither inevitable nor complete. Rheinberger's experiences as a molecular biologist has brought the "materiality of the natural sciences" into the focus of the history of science.

Awards and distinctions 
 1998: Honorary Professor at the Technischen Universität Berlin
 2006: Honorary doctorate at the ETH Zürich
 2006: cogito-award
 2012: Distinguished Lecture der History of Science Society (HSS)
 2014: Marsilius Lecture und Medaille des Marsilius-Kollegs an der Universität Heidelberg

Selected publications 
 Monographies
 Experiment, Differenz, Schrift. Zur Geschichte epistemischer Dinge. Basilisken-Presse, Marburg/Lahn 1992, .
 Experimentalsysteme und epistemische Dinge. Eine Geschichte der Proteinsynthese im Reagenzglas.
 original edition: Toward a History of Epistemic Things. Stanford Univ. Press, 1997, .
 Wallstein-Verlag, Göttingen 2001, .
 Suhrkamp-Taschenbuch Wissenschaft. Bd.  1806, Suhrkamp, 2006, .
 Iterationen (= Internationaler Merve-Diskurs. Bd. 271). Merve-Verlag, Berlin 2005, .
 Epistemologie des Konkreten. Studien zur Geschichte der modernen Biologie (= Suhrkamp-Taschenbuch Wissenschaft. Bd. 1771). Suhrkamp, Frankfurt am Main 2006, .
 Historische Epistemologie zur Einführung (= Zur Einführung. Bd. 336). Junius, Hamburg 2007, .
 On Historicizing Epistemology: An Essay. Stanford University Press, Stanford 2010, .
 An Epistemology of the Concrete: Twentieth-century Histories of Life. Duke University Press, Durham 2010, .
 Introduction à la philosophie des sciences. Editions La Découverte, Paris 2014, .
 Rekurrenzen. Texte zu Althusser. Merve, Berlin 2014, .
 Natur und Kultur im Spiegel des Wissens: Marsilius-Vorlesung am 6. Februar 2014. Universitätsverlag Winter, Heidelberg 2015, .
 Die Farben des Tastens. Edition Faust, Frankfurt am Main 2015, .
 Der Kupferstecher und der Philosoph. Diaphanes, Zürich und Berlin 2016, .
 mit Staffan Müller-Wille:
 Vererbung. Geschichte und Kultur eines biologischen Konzepts. Fischer-Taschenbuch-Verlag, Frankfurt am Main 2009, .
 Das Gen im Zeitalter der Postgenomik. Eine wissenschaftshistorische Bestandsaufnahme. Suhrkamp, Frankfurt am Main 2009,  
 A Cultural History of Heredity. University of Chicago Press, Chicago 2012, .

 Editor
 with Michael Hagner: Die Experimentalisierung des Lebens. Experimentalsysteme in den biologischen Wissenschaften 1850/1950. Akademie-Verlag, Berlin 1993, .
 with Michael Hagner, Bettina Schmidt-Wahrig: Räume des Wissens. Repräsentation, Codierung, Spur. Akademie-Verlag, Berlin 1997, .

 Papers
 Alles, was überhaupt zu einer Inskription führen kann. In: Norbert Haas, Rainer Nägele, Hans-Jörg Rheinberger (Hrsg.): Im Zug der Schrift. Fink, München 1994, S. 295–309.
 Experimental Systems – Graphematic Spaces. In: Timothy Lenoir (Hrsg.): Inscribing Science. Scientific Texts and the Materiality of Communication. Stanford University Press, Stanford CA 1998, S. 285–303.
 Vignette für W. H. In: Aris Fioretos (Hrsg.): Babel. Für Werner Hamacher. Urs Engeler, Basel 2009, S. 314f.

Translations 
 Jacques Derrida: Grammatologie (= Suhrkamp-Taschenbuch Wissenschaft. Bd. 417). Übersetzt von Hans-Jörg Rheinberger und Hanns Zischler. Suhrkamp, Frankfurt am Main 1983,  (Originalausgabe: De la Grammatologie. Éditions de Minuit, Paris 1967).

Festschrift 
 Eine Naturgeschichte für das 21. Jahrhundert: Hommage à Hans-Jörg Rheinberger. Herausgegeben von der Abteilung III des Max-Planck-Instituts für Wissenschaftsgeschichte, Berlin. Alpheus-Verlag, Berlin 2014, .

References

External links 
 
 Hans-Jörg Rheinberger auf der Website des Max-Planck-Instituts für Wissenschaftsgeschichte
 Artikel der Wissenswerkstatt zu Hans-Jörg Rheinbergers Begriff der Experimentalsysteme
 Hans-Jörg Rheinberger: Man weiss nicht genau, was man nicht weiss. Über die Kunst, das Unbekannte zu erforschen, Neue Zürcher Zeitung, 5. Mai 2007

1946 births
Living people
20th-century German historians
21st-century German historians
Historians of science
People from the canton of St. Gallen
University of Tübingen alumni
Technical University of Berlin alumni
Free University of Berlin alumni
Academic staff of the University of Salzburg
Liechtenstein writers
Max Planck Institute directors
Academic staff of the University of Lübeck